Lectionary 2208, or ℓ 2208 in the Gregory-Aland numbering, is a Greek manuscript of the New Testament, on parchment leaves, dated paleographically to the 11th century (or 12th century).

Description  

It is written in Greek minuscule letters, on 207 parchment leaves (22.3 by 17 cm), 2 columns per page, 25 lines per page. The codex contains the Lessons from the four Gospels lectionary (Evangelistarium). Some small parts of the text vanished. 

The codex now is located in the Bible Museum Münster (MS. 18).

See also  

 List of New Testament lectionaries
 Biblical manuscripts 
 Textual criticism 
 Bible Museum Münster

References

External links  

 Lectionary 2208 at the CSNTM 
 Manuscripts of the Bible Museum 

Greek New Testament lectionaries
11th-century biblical manuscripts